
The Cahill ministry (1953–1956) or Second Cahill ministry was the 56th ministry of the New South Wales Government, and was led by the 29th Premier, Joe Cahill, of the Labor Party. The ministry was the second of four consecutive occasions when the Government was led by Cahill as Premier.

Cahill was first elected to the New South Wales Legislative Assembly in 1925 and served until 1932, representing the seats of St George and Arncliffe before being defeated. He was re-elected in 1935, again representing Arncliffe, and then represented Cook's River between 1941 and 1959. Having served continuously as Secretary for Public Works in the first, second, and third ministries of Jim McGirr, when Deputy Premier Jack Baddeley resigned, Cahill was appointed as McGirr's deputy on 21 September 1949. Labor had lost its majority at the 1950 state election and McGirr resigned as Premier on 2 April 1952, with Cahill elected as Labor Leader and became Premier. Cahill led Labor to victory at the 1953 state election, gaining 11 seats and regaining its majority. The main changes from the first Cahill ministry were that Frank Finnan, the Minister for Labour, Industry and Social Welfare whose electorate of Darlinghurst was abolished, he lost a preselection contest for Concord, and failed to win Albury and Joshua Arthur voluntarily stood down as a minister pending a Royal Commission concerning his relationship with Reginald Doyle in the lead-up to the state election on 14 February 1953.

This ministry covers the period from 23 February 1953 until 15 March 1956, when Cahill led Labor to victory at the 1956 state election and the Third Cahill ministry was formed.

Composition of ministry

The composition of the ministry was announced by Premier Cahill following the 1953 state election on 23 February 1953. There was a minor rearrangement of the ministry in September 1953, triggered by the death of the Minister for Transport, Clarrie Martin, on 5 September 1953. Cahill briefly held the Transport portfolio for nine days before he took the opportunity to make a minor rearrangement of the ministry. The second rearrangement of the ministry was triggered by Cahill forcing the resignation of the Minister for Housing and Minister for Co-operative Societies.Clive Evatt.

 
Ministers are members of the Legislative Assembly unless otherwise noted.

See also

Notes

References

 

! colspan="3" style="border-top: 5px solid #cccccc" | New South Wales government ministries

New South Wales ministries
1953 establishments in Australia
1956 disestablishments in Australia
Australian Labor Party ministries in New South Wales